Belsky District is the name of several administrative and municipal districts in Russia.

Districts of the federal subjects

Belsky District, Tver Oblast, an administrative and municipal district of Tver Oblast

Renamed districts
Belsky District, name of Lyubytinsky District of Leningrad Oblast (now of Novgorod Oblast) in 1927–1931
satta king

See also
Belsky (disambiguation)

References